George Ernest Tidwell (August 1, 1931 – August 4, 2011) was a United States district judge of the United States District Court for the Northern District of Georgia.

Education and career

Born in Atlanta, Georgia, Tidwell graduated from the Henry W. Grady High School in Atlanta and then received a Bachelor of Laws from Emory University School of Law in 1954. He was in private practice in Atlanta from 1954 to 1966. He was a legal aide to the House Floor Leader of the Georgia General Assembly from 1964 to 1966. He was an associate general counsel of the State Bar of Georgia from 1965 to 1966. He was an executive assistant attorney general of the State of Georgia from 1966 to 1968. He was a judge of the Civil Court of Fulton County, Georgia from 1968 to 1971. He was a judge of the Superior Court for the Atlanta Judicial Circuit from 1971 to 1979.

Federal judicial service

Tidwell was nominated by President Jimmy Carter on June 5, 1979, to the United States District Court for the Northern District of Georgia, to a new seat created by 92 Stat. 1629. He was confirmed by the United States Senate on July 23, 1979, and received his commission on July 24, 1979. He served as Chief Judge from 1996 to 1999. He assumed senior status on October 8, 1999, serving in that status until his death on August 4, 2011, in Hilton Head Island, South Carolina, while on a family reunion vacation. Tidwell was a resident of Atlanta for his entire life and is interred in Atlanta.

References

Sources
 

1931 births
2011 deaths
Emory University School of Law alumni
Georgia (U.S. state) state court judges
Judges of the United States District Court for the Northern District of Georgia
People from Atlanta
Superior court judges in the United States
United States district court judges appointed by Jimmy Carter
20th-century American judges